David William Clements (born 8 August 1939) was a British ice skater who competed in men's singles. He won the gold medal at the 1959 British Figure Skating Championships and finished 15th at the 1960 Winter Olympics.

References
 Sports-reference profile

External links
 

British male single skaters
1939 births
Olympic figure skaters of Great Britain
Figure skaters at the 1960 Winter Olympics
Living people
Place of birth missing (living people)